Gary Arthur McDaniel (born February 1, 1954 ), better known by his stage name Chuck Dukowski, is an American punk rock musician most well known for being the bass player, and occasional songwriter for Black Flag.

Career

Early years
Dukowski was born and raised in a self-described middle-class family in San Pedro, Los Angeles, California where his father worked for TRW. Dukowski's mother was German and her family lineage had many musicians and composers.

Dukowski attended San Pedro High School and later Chadwick School, where he played football. After graduation, he went to college to study psychobiology.

Würm

Dukowski's first band was Würm which started in 1973. By 1977, the band had moved to Hermosa Beach and lived in a communal house called "the Würmhole" but broke up later that year.

Black Flag

Keith Morris and Greg Ginn were regulars at Würmhole parties in 1977 Dukowski joined their band Panic before they played their first show. Panic changed their name to Black Flag after discovering another band using the name "Panic".  He left the band in 1983 before the recording of My War, and afterward served as Black Flag's manager. He was responsible for booking nationwide and worldwide tours until 1986. Dukowski wrote or co-wrote some of Black Flag's most popular songs, including "My War," "The Bars," "I Love You" and "Modern Man."
Dukowski started SST Records with Ginn in 1978 and was a co-owner until 1989.

Later projects
After Black Flag, Dukowski reformed Würm which continued until guitarist Ed Danky died. Other bands Dukowski formed include SST "supergroup" October Faction, and SWA formed in 1985 with Merrill Ward of Overkill.

Dukowski has a new band with his wife, artist and musician Lora Norton and son Milo called The Chuck Dukowski Sextet. They released their debut album, Eat My Life, on Dukowski's own Nice & Friendly Records in 2006.  In 2013, Chuck launched Flag with former Black Flag members Keith Morris, Bill Stevenson, Dez Cadena, and Descendents/All guitarist Stephen Egerton to perform the music of Black Flag.

He appeared in the documentaries The Decline of Western Civilization, Open Your Mouth And Say... Mr. Chi Pig, We Jam Econo, Urban Struggle: the Battle of the Cuckoo's Nest and "We Were Feared (Clockwork Orange County)".

Stage name
"Chuck Dukowski" is a stage name, originating from a Zippo lighter with "Chuck the Duke" inscribed on it that he found while searching for change. Feeling that the name "Chuck the Duke" sounded macho, he wanted to add a Polish sounding last name, as Poles were frequently picked on. He turned "Chuck the Duke" into "Chuck Dukowski". Dukowski was credited under his real name on original pressings of Black Flag's Nervous Breakdown EP as well as in film The Decline of Western Civilization and its companion soundtrack album. He is credited as "Charles Dukowski" on Black Flag's Damaged LP.

Discography

Black Flag
 Nervous Breakdown EP (1979) – bass
 Jealous Again EP (1980) – bass/vocals
 "Louie Louie" single (1981) – bass
 Six Pack EP (1981) – bass
 Damaged (1981) – bass
 TV Party EP (1982) – bass
 Everything Went Black double LP (1983) – bass
 Slip It In (1984) – guest backing vocals

SWA
 Your Future (If You Have One) (1985) – bass
 Sex Dr. (1986) – bass
 XCIII (1987) – bass
 Evolution 85–87 (1988) – bass
 Winter  (1989) – bass
 Volume (1991) – bass/vocals

Chuck Dukowski Sextet
 Eat My Life (2006) – bass/guitars
 Reverse the Polarity (2007) – bass
 Haunted (2012) – bass

Other
 Wurm – I'm Dead EP (1982) – bass/vocals
 Wurm – Feast''' (1985) – bass
 October Faction – October Faction(1985) – bass/vocals
 October Faction – Second Factionalization (1986) – bass/vocals
 Chuck Dukowski/Paul Cutler/Bill Stinson – United Gang Members CD (1994) – bass/vocals
 Black Face - "I Want to Kill You / Monster" 7" (2011)
 Bl'ast - For Those Who've Graced The Fire!'' single (2015) - bass (as guest)

References

1954 births
Living people
American punk rock bass guitarists
American male bass guitarists
Black Flag (band) members
Hardcore punk musicians
American male guitarists
20th-century American bass guitarists